The Dinokeng Game Reserve is a large wildlife sanctuary in the province of Gauteng, South Africa, and can be accessed via the arterial N1 route. It is a 40-minute drive from Pretoria or some 75 minutes from the O. R. Tambo Airport and Johannesburg. The reserve is the only wildlife sanctuary in Gauteng that offers the Big Five game animals, free walks, and is available for visitors to explore. It covers an area of approximately 21,000 hectares. Its name, Dinokeng, is derived from the language of the baTswana and baPedi people, and is translated as “a place of rivers”.

History
The Dinokeng Game Reserve is part of the Gauteng government's “Blue IQ" project (an entity of the Gauteng Department of Economic Development). The initiatives for conservation taken by the Gauteng Provincial Government has led to the establishment of the Dinokeng Game Reserve that has promoted the concept of ecotourism in Dinokeng. In 1997, the then Premier of Gauteng, Tokyo Sexwale, announced a project to develop “Big Five” wild animal sanctuaries in the northeastern part of Pretoria. The main purpose of the government to establish Dinokeng Game Reserve was to develop tourism through the use of local natural resources, thereby increasing the employment rate and living conditions of local people. The goal is to promote local socio-economic development through the development of “all Africa” destinations, especially those that are historically disadvantaged. The government will help with this project and will work with local landowners to attract private sector investment and ultimately achieve a self-sufficient tourism-based local economy. The Gauteng Provincial Government and more than 170 landowners have developed the concept that ecotourism can be a source of sustainable rural employment for rural communities. The formal planning of Dinokeng and negotiations with landowners began in early 2000, and Dinokeng Game Reserve was officially opened on September 22, 2011. Big Five animals such as leopard, lion, elephant, and buffalo were gradually re-introduced. When a group of black rhinoceros was re-introduced into the reserve in 2018, a Big Five Reserve had been established in the true sense.

Geography and climate

Dinokeng Game Reserve is located in Hammanskraal, north of Pretoria, in northeast Gauteng, 130 km (81 mi) from Johannesburg, close to the western N1 and N4 motorways. It covers an area of approximately 21,000 ha (52,000 acres). It has a latitude of between 25°40'00"S and 25°10'00" and a longitude of between 28°15'00"E and 28°40'00"E, including the current 18,500 ha (46,000 acres).

The Dinokeng area experiences summer rainfall patterns in the form of thunderstorms, which are changeable and varied. Most of the rainfall occurs during the summer, and from December to February, temperatures rise to more than 20 degrees. Rainfall varies from 350 mm (14 in) to 750 mm (30 in) per season. In winter, from May to August, the temperature is relatively mild, sunshine is sufficient, but the temperature difference is large in one day, cold in the morning and evening, and sometimes may drop to zero. During a year, the temperature varies between 0° and 40° with a long-term daily average of 21°. The south area of Dinokeng has a relatively mild climate with hot summers and usually rains in the afternoon. It is cool to very cold in winter. The Dinokeng Game Reserve is free of malaria.

Wildlife

In addition to the Big Five animals (lion, leopard, elephant, cape buffalo and rhinoceros), there are cheetahs, giraffes, zebras, brown hyenas, wildebeests, red hartebeests, tsessebe, eland, kudu, impalas, antelopes, monkey, hippopotamus and crocodiles. And more than three hundred species of birds, including ostrich, osprey, a pair of breeding martial eagles,Fish Eagles,Lilac-Breasted Roller the endangered blue crane, guineafowl, herons, the avocet, stilt, jacana and various plovers, go-away-bird, hornbills, kingfishers, woodpeckers, shrikes, larks, bulbuls, swallows, starlings, thrushes, weavers and waxbills. Martial eagles have been classified as a vulnerable species by the IUCN. Also, Dinokeng Game Reserve may be counted among South Africa's main bird watching sites, rivalling areas like Ndumo Game Reserve in KwaZulu-Natal province in terms of its number of birds. Due to the unique environment, the relatively close positions of water, grass and bush, various groups of birds are attracted.

Tourism
Many adventure tourism companies are located in the metropolitan areas of South Africa, which is an important part of the South African urban tourism market. Dinokeng is one of the popular tourist destinations in Gauteng that offers the natural, historical and cultural sites for the visitors. There are four famous tourist hubs: Dinokeng Central, A Birder's Paradise, the Roodeplaat Dam, and the Dinokeng Game Reserve. Boat cruises, self-drive tours, professional game-drives, cultural tours, fishing, spa treatments, hot air ballooning, and restaurants are located in the reserve. In the Dinokeng Game Reserve, users of self-driving routes can choose from three different picnic sites along the route. These picnic sites are built and maintained by private landowners who do not charge for use unless they want visitors to leave these locations. Like most picnic spots in the game reserve, in order to provide a tighter jungle encounter, they are not fenced. During the game-drives, visitors are asked to use the cars in the protected area instead of their own because those cars minimize the damage and erosion of the soil. In order to avoid excessive interruptions to animals, people are allowed to do game drives only at certain times, one is when the animal is awake in the morning, and the other is when the animals return to the shelter in the evening. Dinokeng Game Reserve tries to make travel more than enjoyment but to integrate learning and promote attitude and behavioral change. There are many posters of endangered species in the reserve, to appeal to locals and tourists to protect animals. Camping visitors are expected to use existing camping camps to prevent the felling of trees. One measurement Dinokeng Game Reserve has taken is to use a hot air balloon to show visitors from an aerial perspective. When visitors saw wildlife activities and some documentaries filmed, it helped them to connect with nature. People who encountered this experience will more likely assume responsibility for protecting the natural environment.

Conservation

Dinokeng game reserve partnered with the South African government to enforce laws that protect the natural resources of protected areas. Most employees in Dinokeng Game Reserves are from local residents living in protected areas and local residents from the communities surrounding the Reserve. At Dinokeng, it implemented different actions that helped spread environmental awareness to surrounding communities and visitors. Wildlife and Ecological Investment (WEI) conducted ecological surveys and biodiversity monitoring in the Dinokeng Game Reserve. Protected areas use the data collected and analyzed by WEI to review changes in protected areas, and management can gain insight into the operation and health of protected areas. In addition, baseline data can contribute to future professional research or management decisions.

Lion conservation 
In fact, there are just two large enough wildlife sanctuaries to self-regulate, Kruger National Park and Kgalagadi Park in South Africa. All other reserves such as the Dinokeng game reserve must be managed by people to maintain a predator-prey balance and avoid inbreeding. The Dinokeng game reserve is a member of the Lions Management Forum (LiMF), a community of reserve managers from all over the country who shares management experience, discusses and finds a management solution that is suitable for long-term subsistence of lions. Although the Dinokeng game reserve has successfully managed the total number of lions through selective contraception, the reserve must address the existence of too many young males. In a vast ecosystem, nature will provide solutions. As sexual maturity, young males will be driven out by the dominant males, and eventually, they will find new pride for themselves. But this natural rule is not applicable to the small reserves, such as Dinokeng. Pressure from the dominant male lion has caused young males to try to escape from the reserve. This can cause serious damage to the perimeter of the reserve. At Dinokeng game reserve, managers make decisions based on evidence and apply ethical principles to determine the management scheme for lions. They value the overall ecosystem approach rather than species-specific approaches, consistent with regional and international laws, policies, guidelines and strategies.

Fatal lion attack
On 27 February 2018 a young woman was mauled to death by a lioness that was under the care of Kevin Richardson. Wildlife biologist Luke Dollar responded to the killing in an article by National Geographic, stating that "behaviors and programs that skirt the reality of our place in the food chain seem to be an accident waiting to happen."

Cheetah conservation 
The cheetah is the second most threatened carnivore in South Africa after the African wild dog. They are listed as endangered species in South Africa. Cheetahs have disappeared from 76% of Africa's historical geographic regions and almost all of Asia's vast historical regions. In the past 13,000 years, cheetahs have been killed because of threats to livestock and human security. Over time, due to crop cultivation and urban development, the cheetah population has been insufficiently spaced. Most importantly, wildlife and humans do not coexist well. One way to deal with this problem is to establish wildlife sanctuaries and isolate humans from animals to ensure the safety of both parties. The challenge with this solution is the limitation of natural gene flow. Wild cheetahs appear in three locations in South Africa. First, huge reserves, such as Kruger National Park and Kgalagadi, with a large enough gene pool with more than 600 cheetahs in total, so they do not require human intervention and management. Second, in the farmland on the border of Botswana, the free-roaming population is 350–400. Third, there are about 340 scattered cheetahs distributed in 54 reserves including the Dinokeng game reserve. Each protected area has an average of 6 or 7 cheetahs, which means that inbreeding is a problem that needs to be avoided. Therefore, the Dinokeng game reserve is part of the EWT (Endangered Wildlife Trust) Cheetah Metapopulation project. The purpose of the Metapopulation project is to prevent this inbreeding and to ensure the long-term viability of cheetahs in small fenced reserves, also ensure the long-time genetic and demographic integrity of the collective population.

Administration
Dinokeng Game Reserve is a wildlife area in which tourism and conservation are combined, and it was created through a public-private partnership that required the collaboration of local landowners and the South African government. The Dinokeng project is funded by public funds and managed by the government, but the private landowners retain ownership of the land.

As a part of the municipal spatial planning process, an environmental management framework (EMF) is utilized to promote sustainable development through holistic planning efforts. Regional planning initiatives such as the EMF project and regional space development frameworks contribute to strengthening the planning framework. The EMF process integrates stakeholders from both physical and virtual environments and has a specific goal of creating a self-sustaining tourism economy in the case of Dinokeng Game Reserve. The EMF has established resources and parameters to ensure the sustainable development of various natural activities, which directly or indirectly influence planning decisions related to natural resources.

References

External links

Martial Eagles Mating A sighting of the largest African eagle, mating at a nesting site in Dinokeng Game Reserve.

 Nature reserves in South Africa
 Wildlife sanctuaries of South Africa
 Tourist attractions in Gauteng